Richard Mullaney (born February 23, 1993) is a former American football wide receiver. He played college football at Oregon State and Alabama, and signed with the Houston Texans as an undrafted free agent in 2016. He has also been a member of the Dallas Cowboys, Cleveland Browns, Arizona Hotshots, and DC Defenders.

College career
Mullaney committed to Oregon State and then transferred to Alabama totaling 10 touchdowns throughout his career. He caught 38 passes for 390 yards and a career high 5 touchdowns as a senior en route to a National Championship with the 2015 Alabama Crimson Tide football team.

Professional career

Houston Texans
On May 6, 2016, Mullaney went undrafted and signed with the Houston Texans, but was waived on July 25, 2016.

Dallas Cowboys
On August 16, 2016, Mullaney was signed by the Dallas Cowboys, only to be waived on August 30, 2016.

Cleveland Browns
On June 12, 2017, Mullaney was signed by the Cleveland Browns. He was waived on September 1, 2017 during roster cutdowns.

Arizona Hotshots
In 2018, Mullaney signed with the Arizona Hotshots for the 2019 season. The league ceased operations in April 2019.

DC Defenders
During the 2020 XFL Draft in October 2019, Mullaney was selected by the DC Defenders in the open phase. He was placed on a reserve list before the start of the regular season and waived on February 18, 2020.

References

External links
Oregon State Beavers bio
Richard Mullaney CFB Reference

1993 births
Living people
People from Thousand Oaks, California
Players of American football from California
Sportspeople from Ventura County, California
Oregon State Beavers football players
Alabama Crimson Tide football players
Cleveland Browns players
Arizona Hotshots players
DC Defenders players
American football wide receivers
American people of Irish descent